A double bind is a dilemma in communication in which an individual (or group) receives two or more reciprocally conflicting messages. In some scenarios (e.g. within families or romantic relationships) this can be emotionally distressing, creating a situation in which a successful response to one message results in a failed response to the other (and vice versa), such that the person responding  will automatically be perceived as in the wrong, no matter how they respond. This double bind prevents the person from either resolving the underlying dilemma or opting out of the situation.

Double bind theory was first described by Gregory Bateson and his colleagues in the 1950s, in a theory on the origins of schizophrenia and post-traumatic stress disorder.

Double binds are often utilized as a form of control without open coercion—the use of confusion makes them difficult both to respond to and to resist.

A double bind generally includes different levels of abstraction in the order of messages and these messages can either be stated explicitly or implicitly within the context of the situation, or they can be conveyed by tone of voice or body language. Further complications arise when frequent double binds are part of an ongoing relationship to which the person or group is committed.

Explanation
The double bind is often misunderstood to be a simple contradictory situation, where the subject is trapped by two conflicting demands. While it's true that the core of the double bind is two conflicting demands, the difference lies in how they are imposed upon the subject, what the subject's understanding of the situation is, and who (or what) imposes these demands upon the subject. Unlike the usual no-win situation, the subject has difficulty in defining the exact nature of the paradoxical situation in which they are caught. The contradiction may be unexpressed in its immediate context and therefore invisible to external observers, only becoming evident when a prior communication is considered. Typically, a demand is imposed upon the subject by someone whom they respect (such as a parent, teacher, or doctor) but the demand itself is inherently impossible to fulfill because some broader context forbids it. For example, this situation arises when a person in a position of authority imposes two contradictory conditions but there exists an unspoken rule that one must never question authority.

Gregory Bateson and his colleagues defined the double bind as follows (paraphrased):

Thus, the essence of a double bind is two conflicting demands, each on a different logical level, neither of which can be ignored or escaped. This leaves the subject torn both ways, so that whichever demand they try to meet, the other demand cannot be met. "I must do it, but I can't do it" is a typical description of the double-bind experience.

For a double bind to be effective, the subject must be unable to confront or resolve the conflict between the demand placed by the primary injunction and that of the secondary injunction. In this sense, the double bind differentiates itself from a simple contradiction to a more inexpressible internal conflict, where the subject really wants to meet the demands of the primary injunction, but fails each time through an inability to address the situation's incompatibility with the demands of the secondary injunction. Thus, subjects may express feelings of extreme anxiety in such a situation, as they attempt to fulfill the demands of the primary injunction albeit with obvious contradictions in their actions.

This was a problem in United States legal circles prior to the Fifth Amendment to the United States Constitution being applied to state action. A person could be subpoenaed to testify in a federal case and given Fifth Amendment immunity for testimony in that case. However, since the immunity did not apply to a state prosecution, the person could refuse to testify at the Federal level despite being given immunity, thus subjecting the person to imprisonment for contempt of court, or the person could testify, and the information they were forced to give in the Federal proceeding could then be used to convict the person in a state proceeding.

History
The term double bind was first used by the anthropologist Gregory Bateson and his colleagues (including Don D. Jackson, Jay Haley and John H. Weakland) in the mid-1950s in their discussions on complexity of communication in relation to schizophrenia. Bateson made clear that such complexities are common in normal circumstances, especially in "play, humour, poetry, ritual and fiction" (see Logical Types below). Their findings indicated that the tangles in communication often diagnosed as schizophrenia are not necessarily the result of an organic brain dysfunction. Instead, they found that destructive double binds were a frequent pattern of communication among families of patients, and they proposed that growing up amidst perpetual double binds could lead to learned patterns of confusion in thinking and communication.

Complexity in communication
Human communication is complex, and context is an essential part of it. Communication consists of the words said, tone of voice, and body language. It also includes how these relate to what has been said in the past; what is not said, but is implied; how these are modified by other nonverbal cues, such as the environment in which it is said, and so forth. For example, if someone says "I love you", one takes into account who is saying it, their tone of voice and body language, and the context in which it is said. It may be a declaration of passion or a serene reaffirmation, insincere and/or manipulative, an implied demand for a response, a joke, its public or private context may affect its meaning, and so forth.

Conflicts in communication are common and often we ask "What do you mean?" or seek clarification in other ways. This is called meta-communication: communication about the communication. Sometimes, asking for clarification is impossible. Communication difficulties in ordinary life often occur when meta-communication and feedback systems are lacking or inadequate or there isn't enough time for clarification.
 
Double binds can be extremely stressful and become destructive when one is trapped in a dilemma and punished for finding a way out.  But making the effort to find the way out of the trap can lead to emotional growth.

Examples
The classic example given of a negative double bind is of a mother telling her child that she loves them, while at the same time turning away in disgust, or inflicting corporal punishment as discipline: the words are socially acceptable; the body language is in conflict with it. The child does not know how to respond to the conflict between the words and the body language and, because the child is dependent on the mother for basic needs, they are in a quandary. Small children have difficulty articulating contradictions verbally and can neither ignore them nor leave the relationship.

Another example is when one is commanded to "be spontaneous". The very command contradicts spontaneity, but it only becomes a double bind when one can neither ignore the command nor comment on the contradiction. 
Often, the contradiction in communication is not apparent to bystanders unfamiliar with previous communications.

Phrase examples
 An example from Gerald M. Weinberg in a non-family situation.... "I suggest you find someone who you feel is more capable in this role".  This requires the recipient to either confirm that the current incumbent in the role is sufficiently capable, or accept that they choose someone else based on their feelings - not an objective assessment of whether the incumbent is capable.  
Mother telling her child: "You must love me".

 The primary injunction here is the command itself: "you must"; the secondary injunction is the unspoken reality that love is spontaneous, that for the child to love the mother genuinely, it can only be of their own accord.
 Child-abuser to child: "You should have escaped from me earlier, now it's too late—because now, nobody will believe that you didn't want what I have done", while at the same time blocking all of the child's attempts to escape.

 Child-abusers often start the double-bind relationship by "grooming" the child, giving little concessions, or gifts or privileges to them, thus the primary injunction is: "You should like what you are getting from me!"

 When the child begins to go along (i.e. begins to like what they are receiving from the person), then the interaction goes to the next level and small victimization occurs, with the secondary injunction being: "I am punishing you! (for whatever reason the child-abuser is coming up with, e.g. "because you were bad/naughty/messy", or "because you deserve it", or "because you made me do it", etc.).

 If child shows any resistance (or tries to escape) from the abuser, then the words: "You should have escaped from me earlier (...)" serve as the third level or tertiary injunction.

 Then the loop starts to feed on itself, allowing for ever worse victimization to occur.

 Mother to son: "Leave your sister alone!", while the son knows his sister will approach and antagonize him to get him into trouble.

 The primary injunction is the command, which he will be punished for breaking. The secondary injunction is the knowledge that his sister will get into conflict with him, but his mother will not know the difference and will default to punishing him. He may be under the impression that if he argues with his mother, he may be punished. One possibility for the son to escape this double bind is to realize that his sister only antagonizes him to make him feel anxious (if indeed it is the reason behind his sister's behavior).

 If he were not bothered about punishment, his sister might not bother him. He could also leave the situation entirely, avoiding both the mother and the sister. The sister can't claim to be bothered by a non-present brother, and the mother can't punish (or scapegoat) a non-present son. Other solutions exist too, which are based on the creative application of logic and reasoning.
 An apt reply would be: "Please tell sis the same". If mother wants to 'scapegoat' him, her response will be negative. The command has a negative undertone towards the son.

Positive double binds 

Bateson also described positive double binds, both in relation to Zen Buddhism with its path of spiritual growth, and the use of therapeutic double binds by psychiatrists to confront their patients with the contradictions in their life in such a way that would help them heal. One of Bateson's consultants, Milton H. Erickson (5 volumes, edited by Rossi) eloquently demonstrated the productive possibilities of double binds through his own life, showing the technique in a brighter light.

Science 

One of the causes of double binds is the loss of feedback systems. Gregory Bateson and Lawrence S. Bale describe double binds that have arisen in science that have caused decades-long delays of progress in science because the scientific community had defined something as outside of its scope (or as "not science")—see Bateson in his Introduction to Steps to an Ecology of Mind (1972, 2000), pp. xv–xxvi; and Bale in his article, Gregory Bateson, Cybernetics and the Social/Behavioral Sciences (esp. pp. 1–8) on the paradigm of classical science vs. that of systems theory/cybernetics. (See also Bateson's description in his Forward of how the double bind hypothesis fell into place).

Work by Bateson

Schizophrenia 

The Double Bind Theory was first articulated in relationship to schizophrenia when Bateson and his colleagues hypothesized that schizophrenic thinking was not necessarily an inborn mental disorder but a pattern of learned helplessness in response to cognitive double-binds externally imposed.

It is helpful to remember the context in which these ideas were developed. Bateson and his colleagues were working in the Veteran's Administration Hospital (1949–1962) with World War II veterans. As soldiers they'd been able to function well in combat, but the effects of life-threatening stress had affected them.  At that time, 18 years before Post-Traumatic Stress Disorder was officially recognized, the veterans had been saddled with the catch-all diagnosis of schizophrenia.  Bateson didn't challenge the diagnosis but he did maintain that the seeming nonsense the patients said at times did make sense within context, and he gives numerous examples in section III of Steps to an Ecology of Mind, "Pathology in Relationship".  Bateson also surmised that people habitually caught in double binds in childhood would have greater problems—that in the case of the person with schizophrenia, the double bind is presented continually and habitually within the family context from infancy on. By the time the child is old enough to have identified the double bind situation, it has already been internalized, and the child is unable to confront it. The solution then is to create an escape from the conflicting logical demands of the double bind, in the world of the delusional system (see in Towards a Theory of Schizophrenia – Illustrations from Clinical Data).

One solution to a double bind is to place the problem in a larger context, a state Bateson identified as Learning III, a step up from Learning II (which requires only learned responses to reward/consequence situations). In Learning III, the double bind is contextualized and understood as an impossible no-win scenario so that ways around it can be found.

Bateson's double bind theory has not yet been followed up with any known published research, as to whether family systems imposing systematic double binds might be a cause of schizophrenia. The current understanding of schizophrenia emphasizes the robust scientific evidence for a genetic predisposition to the disorder.  Psychosocial stressors, including dysfunctional family interaction, are secondary causative factors in some instances.

Evolution 

After many years of research into schizophrenia, Bateson continued to explore problems of communication and learning, first with dolphins, and then with the more abstract processes of evolution. Bateson emphasized that any communicative system characterized by different logical levels might be subject to double bind problems. Especially including the communication of characteristics from one generation to another (genetics and evolution).

"...evolution always followed the pathways of viability. As Lewis Carroll has pointed out, the theory [of natural selection] explains quite satisfactorily why there are no bread-and-butter-flies today."

Bateson used the fictional Bread and Butter Fly (from Through the Looking Glass, and What Alice Found There) to illustrate the double bind in terms of natural selection. The gnat points out that the insect would be doomed if he found his food (which would dissolve his own head, since this insect's head is made of sugar, and his only food is tea), and starve if he did not. Alice suggests that this must happen quite often, to which the gnat replies: "It always happens."

The pressures that drive evolution therefore represent a genuine double bind. And there is truly no escape: "It always happens." No species can escape natural selection, including our own.

Bateson suggested that all evolution is driven by the double bind, whenever circumstances change: If any environment becomes toxic to any species, that species will die out unless it transforms into another species, in which case, the species becomes extinct anyway.

Most significant here is Bateson's exploration of what he later came to call "the pattern that connects"—that problems of communication which span more than one level (e.g., the relationship between the individual and the family) should also be expected to be found spanning other pairs of levels in the hierarchy (e.g. the relationship between the genotype and the phenotype):

"We are very far, then, from being able to pose specific questions for the geneticist; but I believe that the wider implications of what I have been saying modify somewhat the philosophy of genetics. Our approach to the problems of schizophrenia by way of a theory of levels or logical types has disclosed first that the problems of adaptation and learning and their pathologies must be considered in terms of a hierarchic system in which stochastic change occurs at the boundary points between the segments of the hierarchy. We have considered three such regions of stochastic change—the level of genetic mutation, the level of learning, and the level of change in family organization. We have disclosed the possibility of a relationship of these levels which orthodox genetics would deny, and we have disclosed that at least in human societies the evolutionary system consists not merely in the selective survival of those persons who happen to select appropriate environments but also in the modification of family environment in a direction which might enhance the phenotypic and genotypic characteristics of the individual members."

Girard's mimetic double bind
René Girard, in his literary theory of mimetic desire, proposes what he calls a "model-obstacle", a role model who demonstrates an object of desire and yet, in possessing that object, becomes a rival who obstructs fulfillment of the desire. According to Girard, the "internal mediation" of this mimetic dynamic "operates along the same lines as what Gregory Bateson called the 'double bind'." Girard found in Sigmund Freud's psychoanalytic theory, a precursor to mimetic desire. "The individual who 'adjusts' has managed to relegate the two contradictory injunctions of the double bind—to imitate and not to imitate—to two different domains of application. This is, he divides reality in such a way as to neutralize the double bind." While critical of Freud's doctrine of the unconscious mind, Girard sees the ancient Greek tragedy, Oedipus Rex, and key elements of Freud's Oedipus complex, patricidal and incestuous desire, to serve as prototypes for his own analysis of the mimetic double bind.

Neuro-linguistic programming
The field of neuro-linguistic programming also makes use of the expression "double bind". Grinder and Bandler (both of whom had personal contact with Bateson and Erickson) asserted that a message could be constructed with multiple messages, whereby the recipient of the message is given the impression of choice—although both options have the same outcome at a higher level of intention. This is called a "double bind" in NLP terminology, and has applications in both sales and therapy. In therapy, the practitioner may seek to challenge destructive double binds that limit the client in some way and may also construct double binds in which both options have therapeutic consequences. In a sales context, the speaker may give the respondent the illusion of choice between two possibilities. For example, a salesperson might ask: "Would you like to pay cash or by credit card?", with both outcomes presupposing that the person will make the purchase; whereas the third option (that of not buying) is intentionally excluded from the spoken choices.

Note that in the NLP context, the use of the phrase "double bind" does not carry the primary definition of two conflicting messages; it is about creating a false sense of choice which ultimately binds to the intended outcome. In the "cash or credit card?" example, this is not a "Bateson double bind" since there is no contradiction, although it still is an "NLP double bind". Similarly if a salesman were selling a book about the evils of commerce, it could perhaps be a "Bateson double bind" if the buyer happened to believe that commerce was evil, yet felt compelled or obliged to buy the book.

See also

Notes

References
 
 
 Bateson, Gregory. (1972, 1999) Steps to an Ecology of Mind: Collected Essays in Anthropology, Psychiatry, Evolution, and Epistemology.Part III: Form and Pathology in Relationship. University of Chicago Press, 1999, originally published, San Francisco: Chandler Pub. Co., 1972.
Gibney, Paul (May 2006) The Double Bind Theory:  Still Crazy-Making After All These Years. in Psychotherapy in Australia. Vol. 12. No. 3. https://web.archive.org/web/20110706111135/http://www.psychotherapy.com.au/TheDoubleBindTheory.pdf
Koopmans, Matthijs (1998) Schizophrenia and the Family II:  Paradox and Absurdity in Human Communication Reconsidered. http://www.goertzel.org/dynapsyc/1998/KoopmansPaper.htm
Zysk, Wolfgang (2004), "Körpersprache – Eine neue Sicht", Doctoral Dissertation 2004, University Duisburg-Essen (Germany).

External links
https://web.archive.org/web/20080211090234/http://www.mri.org/dondjackson/brp.htm
https://web.archive.org/web/20080126114245/http://www.behavenet.com/capsules/treatments/famsys/dblebnd.htm
https://web.archive.org/web/20080215124155/http://laingsociety.org/cetera/pguillaume.htm
Reference in Encyclopedia of NLP
Double-bind loop feeding on itself, an illustration by chart (and a poem)

Communication of falsehoods
Cybernetics
Systems psychology
Dilemmas
1956 introductions